The list of ship launches in 1935 includes a chronological list of some ships launched in 1935.

References

Sources

1935
Ship launches